YSM, or ysm, may refer to:

People 
 Yadav Shivram Mahajan (born 1911), member of the 4th Lok Sabha of India from the Buldhana constituency of Maharashtra elected in 1970 by-elections and a member of the Indian National Congress (INC) political party
 Yésica Sánchez Maya (born 1977), human rights attorney who works in Oaxaca, Mexico
 Yosuke Santa Maria (born 1991), . He is a former Open the Owarai Gate Champion
 Yurii Sh. Matros (born 1937), scientist in the field of chemical engineering, known for his achievement in the theory and practice of heterogeneous catalytic processes

Transport 
 YSM, the IATA code for Fort Smith Airport in the Northwest Territories, Canada
 YSM, the National Rail code for Ystrad Mynach railway station in Wales, UK

Other uses 
 Anglesey, Welsh Ynys Môn, island off Whales, IIGA code
 Yahoo! Search Marketing, a keyword-based Internet advertising service
 Yale School of Medicine, the graduate medical school at Yale University in New Haven, Connecticut, United States
 Yale School of Music, the graduate music school at Yale University
 Yale Scientific Magazine, a scientific magazine published quarterly by undergraduate students from Yale University
 Yourdon Structured Method, one of the structured design methods in software development life cycle
 ysm, the ISO 639-3 code for Burmese sign language
 Yudh Seva Medal, an Indian military decoration

See also